The 2005 Brisbane Broncos season was the eighteenth in the club's history, and they competed in the NRL's 2005 Telstra Premiership. Coached by Wayne Bennett and captained by Darren Lockyer, they finished the regular season 3rd (out of 15) despite ending the year with another long losing streak which continued into the play-offs and saw them knocked out once again.

Season summary 
With Gorden Tallis' retirement at the end of the previous season, the Broncos' captaincy was passed onto star fullback-turned-5/8th Darren Lockyer. In round 1 of NRL season 2005 Lockyer led the Broncos out for the first time and won 29-16 against the North Queensland Cowboys, the team that knocked them out of the finals in their last match the previous year. Three weeks later, the Broncos suffered their worst defeat in the club's history with a 50-4 loss to the Melbourne Storm at Olympic Park. After this match, the Broncos won their next ten matches straight from round 5 to round 17 to lead the competition, only to lose their last five regular season game in a row from round 22 to round 26, finishing third heading into the finals. The losing streak extended into the finals with defeats in the Qualifying Final to the Melbourne Storm 24-18 and in the Semi Final to the Wests Tigers 34-6, sending them out of the competition and making it seven consecutive losses in and seven straight finals losses for the Broncos.

At the end of the 2005 season, after five successive years without a grand final appearance, Bennett decided to have a cleanout of the coaching staff, removing such long-time allies as Gary Belcher, Glenn Lazarus and Kevin Walters.

Match results 

 *Game following a State of Origin match

Season Ladder

Players 

 Berrick Barnes
 Barry Berrigan
 Shaun Berrigan
 Leon Bott
 Dane Carlaw
 Tonie Carroll
 Petero Civoniceva
 Neville Costigan
 Nathan Daly
 Greg Eastwood
 Justin Hodges
 Karmichael Hunt
 Stuart Kelly
 Nick Kenny
 Tom Learoyd-Lars
 Darren Lockyer (c)
 Darren Mapp
 Casey McGuire
 Stephen Michaels
 Scott Minto
 Nick Parfitt
 Corey Parker
 Brett Seymour
 Darren Smith
 David Stagg
 Brent Tate
 Sam Thaiday
 Brad Thorn
 Tame Tupou
 Shane Webcke
 Neale Wyatt

Scorers

Honours

League 
 Nil

Club 
 Player of the year: Shane Webcke
 Rookie of the year: Leon Bott
 Back of the year: Justin Hodges
 Forward of the year: Petero Civoniceva
 Club man of the year: Tony Duggan

References

External links 
 Brisbane Broncos 2005 at sportsphotography.net
 Rugby League Tables and Statistics
  

Brisbane Broncos seasons
Brisbane Broncos season